The Eurasian or common whimbrel (Numenius phaeopus), also known as the white-rumped whimbrel in North America, is a wader in the large family Scolopacidae. It is one of the most widespread of the curlews, breeding across much of subarctic Asia and Europe as far south as Scotland. This species and the Hudsonian whimbrel have recently been split, although some taxonomic authorities still consider them to be conspecific.

Taxonomy
The Eurasian whimbrel was formally described by the Swedish naturalist Carl Linnaeus in 1758 in the tenth edition of his Systema Naturae under the binomial name Scolopax phaeopus. It is now placed with the curlews in the genus Numenius that was introduced by the French ornithologist Mathurin Jacques Brisson in 1760. The genus name Numenius is from Ancient Greek noumenios, a bird mentioned by Hesychius. It is associated with the curlews because it appears to be derived from neos, "new" and mene "moon", referring to the crescent-shaped bill. The specific epithet phaeopus is the Medieval Latin name for the bird, from Ancient Greek phaios, "dusky" and pous, "foot". The English name "whimbrel" is imitative of the bird's call.

Five subspecies are recognised:
 N. p. islandicus Brehm, C.L., 1831 – breeds mainly in Iceland, but also in Greenland, Faroe Islands, and Scotland; winters mainly in West Africa, but ranges from southwestern Europe to Benin and Togo
 N. p. phaeopus (European whimbrel ) (Linnaeus, 1758) – nominate, breeds from Norway to north central Siberia; winters in Africa and south and southeast Asia
 N. p. alboaxillaris Lowe, 1921 – breeds from western Kazakhstan to southwestern Siberia (rare, endangered); winters in south and east Asia
 N. p. rogachevae Tomkovich, 2008 – breeds in north central Siberia; winters in east Africa and west India
 N. p. variegatus (Scopoli, 1786) – breeds in northeastern Siberia; winters in India to Australia

The Hudsonian curlew (Numenius hudsonicus) was formerly considered to be conspecific. The two species were split based on genetic and plumage differences.

Differences in species
The common whimbrel was traditionally considered a sub-cosmopolitan bird, breeding in Russia and Canada, then migrating to coasts all around the world to spend the winter. However the North American population of whimbrels were considered distinct enough to be considered a separate species from the common whimbrel. In 2020, the new world population was recognised as a separate species, with the whimbrel in North America being assigned to the binomial name Numenius hudsonicus.

Whilst very similar at an initial glance, there are several features that distinguish whimbrel species in the old and new world. In appearance, the New world species has a more “faded” appearance, with differences in the supercilium and crown. By far the most significant difference may be seen in the lower half of the bird. Whimbrels in Europe and Asia have a primarily white rump that can be seen in flight, while whimbrel in the new world have a rump similar in colour to the rest of the bird - drab brown with dark streaking. As a result, whimbrel on vagrancy trips to North America may be known as the “white-rumped whimbrel”, while whimbrel vagrants from North America to Europe may be known as “Hudsonian whimbrel”.

When the context of their location is known, both species may be simply known as the whimbrel.

Description 
The Eurasian whimbrel is a fairly large wader, though mid-sized as a member of the curlew genus. It is mainly greyish brown, with a white back and rump (subspecies N. p. phaeopus and N. p. alboaxillaris only), and a long curved beak with a kink rather than a smooth curve. The usual call is a rippling whistle, prolonged into a trill for the song. The only similar common species over most of this bird's range are larger curlews. The whimbrel is smaller, has a shorter, decurved bill and has a central crown stripe and strong supercilia.

Distribution and migration
The whimbrel is a migratory bird wintering on coasts in Africa, and South Asia into Australasia. It is also a coastal bird during migration. It is fairly gregarious outside the breeding season. It is found in Ireland and the United Kingdom, and it breeds in Scotland, particularly around Shetland, Orkney, the Outer Hebrides as well as the mainland at Sutherland and Caithness.

Behaviour and ecology

Breeding
The nest is a bare scrape on tundra or Arctic moorland. Three to five eggs are laid. Adults are very defensive of nesting area and will even attack humans who come too close.

Food and feeding
This species feeds by probing soft mud for small invertebrates and by picking small crabs and similar prey off the surface. Before migration, berries become an important part of their diet. It has also been observed taking insects, specifically blue tiger butterflies

Conservation
The whimbrel is listed in the Agreement on the Conservation of African-Eurasian Migratory Waterbirds. Near the end of the 19th century, hunting on the Eurasian whimbrel's migration routes took a heavy toll on its population, which has since recovered. It is listed as Least Concern on the IUCN Red List and has been negatively impacted by climate change, habitat destruction and outbreaks of Avian flu to which it is susceptible.

The whimbrel and the Hudsonian curlew are considered to be conspecific.

References

External links 

 Whimbrel Species Account – Cornell Lab of Ornithology
 Whimbrel – Species text in The Atlas of Southern African Birds.
 Whimbrel – Numenius phaeopus – USGS Patuxent Bird Identification InfoCenter
 Whimbrel Migration Studies  – The Center for Conservation Biology, College of William and Mary & Virginia Commonwealth University
 
 RSPB Birds by Name: Whimbrel
 
 
 
 

Eurasian whimbrel
Birds of Eurasia
Eurasian whimbrel
Eurasian whimbrel